Sir William Herbert Ellery Gilbert,  (born Herbert Ellery Gilbert; 20 July 1916 – 26 September 1987), was a New Zealand military leader and intelligence service director.

Gilbert was born in Wanganui on 20 July 1916. In 1956, he was tasked by Jack Marshall, then Minister of Justice, with setting up the New Zealand Security Service. Over 19 years, he served under seven Prime Ministers. He was appointed Knight Commander of the Order of the British Empire (KBE) in the 1976 Queen's Birthday Honours, just one month prior to his retirement.

He was born as Herbert Ellery Gilbert. At the Australian Royal Military College in Duntroon he was nicknamed Bill, and the name stuck. After his retirement, he changed his name by deed poll to William Herbert Ellery Gilbert.

References

1916 births
1987 deaths
New Zealand military personnel
New Zealand Companions of the Distinguished Service Order
New Zealand Knights Commander of the Order of the British Empire
New Zealand brigadiers
New Zealand military personnel of World War II
New Zealand public servants
People from Whanganui
Royal Military College, Duntroon graduates